Ariobarzanes (died 330 BC), was an Achaemenid prince, satrap and a Persian military commander who led an ambush of the Persian army at the Battle of the Persian Gate against Macedonian King Alexander the Great in the winter of 330 BC.

Life

Though the exact birth date of Ariobarzanes is unknown. His sister was the ancient Persian noblewoman and warrior Youtab. Ariobarzanes was appointed as the first satrap of Persis (the southern province of Fars in present-day Iran) in 335 BC by Darius III Codomannus. Historians are surprised that Darius III appointed a satrap for Persepolis and Persis; apparently, that office did not previously exist. Ariobarzanes commanded part of the Persian Army fighting against the Macedonians at the Battle of Gaugamela in 331 BC.

Death
After the Battle in Gaugamela, Alexander the Great split his army and led his 14,000-strong force towards the Persian capital via the Persian Gates. There Ariobarzanes successfully ambushed Alexander the Great's army, inflicting heavy casualties. The Persian success at the Battle of the Persian Gate was short-lived though; after being held off for 30 days, Alexander the Great outflanked and destroyed the defenders. Some sources indicate that the Persians were betrayed by a captured tribal chief who showed the Macedonians an alternate path that allowed them to outflank Ariobarzanes in a reversal of Thermopylae. Ariobarzanes managed to escape, but when he reached Persepolis, he was denied entrance to the city. The commander of the city's garrison had decided the outcome of the battle, and was convinced that Alexander was bound to the throne of the empire. Ariobarzanes made his last stand at the Persian Gates; and was likely killed by the advancing Macedonian army. Afterward, Alexander continued towards Persepolis, seizing the city and its treasury, and eventually looting the city months after its fall.

Alexander the Great replaced him with Phrasaortes as Hellenistic satrap of Persis.

See also
Battle of the Persian Gate

References

External links
Ariobarzanes: An Article by Jona Lendering.
Pharnabazus, The Columbia Encyclopedia, Sixth Edition 2006.
King Darius III: A Research Article on Darius-III Codomannus
Gabae: The name of two places in Persia and Sogdiana.
Persian Gates: Photos of the battlefield.
Ariobarzanes of Persis by Nabil Rastani

368 BC births
330 BC deaths
4th-century BC Iranian people
Governors of Fars
Satraps of the Achaemenid Empire
Military personnel killed in action